Munditia is a genus of sea snails, marine gastropod mollusks in the family Liotiidae.

Distribution
This marine genus occurs off New South Wales, South Australia, Tasmania, Victoria and Western Australia. Some species are endemic to New Zealand. Munditia meridionalis occurs in subantarctic waters off the South Orkney Islands and the South Shetland Islands

Species
Species within the genus Munditia include:
 Munditia anomala Powell, 1940
 Munditia aupouria Powell, 1937
 Munditia daedala (A. Adams, 1863)
 Munditia delicatula Powell, 1940
 Munditia echinata Powell, 1937
 Munditia gaudens (Melvill & Standen, 1912)
 Munditia hedleyi (Prichard & Gatliff, 1899)
 Munditia manawatawhia Powell, 1937
 Munditia mayana (Tate, 1899)
 Munditia meridionalis (Melvill & Standen, 1912)
 Munditia owengaensis Powell, 1933
 †Munditia proavita Laws, 1936
 Munditia serrata (Suter, 1908)
 Munditia subquadrata (Tenison-Woods, 1878)
 Munditia suteri (Mestayer, 1919)
 Munditia tasmanica (Tenison-Woods, 1875)
 Munditia tryphenensis Powell, 1926

Species brought into synonymy
 Munditia immaculata Tenison-Woods, J.E., 1877: synonym of Munditia subquadrata (Tenison-Woods, 1878)
 Munditia siderea Angas, G.F., 1865: synonym of Munditia tasmanica (Tenison-Woods, 1875)

References

 Cotton, B. C. (1959). South Australian Mollusca. Archaeogastropoda. Adelaide. : W.L. Hawes. 449 pp., 1 pl.
 Wilson, B. (1993). Australian Marine Shells. Prosobranch Gastropods. Kallaroo, WA : Odyssey Publishing. Vol.1 1st Edn pp. 1–408
 Spencer, H.; Marshall. B. (2009). All Mollusca except Opisthobranchia. In: Gordon, D. (Ed.) (2009). New Zealand Inventory of Biodiversity. Volume One: Kingdom Animalia. 584 pp

External links
 Genus Munditia, Finlay; Transactions and Proceedings of the Royal Society of New Zealand 1868-1961

 
Liotiidae
Taxa named by Harold John Finlay